Darcy O'Brien (July 16, 1939, in Los Angeles – March 2, 1998, in Tulsa, Oklahoma) was an award-winning American author of fiction and literary criticism, most well known for his work in the genre of true crime. His first novel, A Way of Life, Like Any Other, was a fictionalized account of his childhood in Hollywood. In 1985, he wrote a book about the Hillside Stranglers entitled Two of a Kind: The Hillside Stranglers, which was adapted into a made-for-television film called The Case of the Hillside Stranglers, starring Richard Crenna.

Biography
Darcy O'Brien was born in Los Angeles, the son of Hollywood silent film actor George O'Brien and actress Marguerite Churchill, a frequent co-star of John Wayne.

O'Brien attended Princeton University and University of Cambridge, and received a master's degree and doctorate from the University of California, Berkeley. From 1965 to 1978 he was a professor of English at Pomona College. In 1978 he moved to Tulsa, and taught at the University of Tulsa until 1995.

O'Brien was married three times and had one daughter named Molly O'Brien. His sister is Orin O'Brien, a double bassist and member of the New York Philharmonic.

O'Brien died of a heart attack in Tulsa on March 2, 1998.

Awards
 1978: Ernest Hemingway Award for best first novel, A Way of Life, Like Any Other
 1997: Edgar Allan Poe Award, Power to Hurt

O'Brien was inducted into the Oklahoma Writers Hall of Fame in 1997.

Selected works
 A Way of Life, Like Any Other (1977 & 2001). New York: Norton.  . 
 Moment by Moment, novelization of screenplay by Jane Wagner (1979)
 The Silver Spooner (1981)
 Two of a Kind: The Story of the Hillside Stranglers (1985)
 Murder in Little Egypt (1989)
 Margaret in Hollywood (1991)
 A Dark and Bloody Ground (1993)
 Power to Hurt (1996)
 The Hidden Pope (1998)
 The Conscience of James Joyce (2016)

References

External links

1939 births
1998 deaths
20th-century American novelists
American male novelists
American non-fiction crime writers
American academics of English literature
Hemingway Foundation/PEN Award winners
20th-century American male writers
20th-century American non-fiction writers
American male non-fiction writers
Pomona College faculty